Harleston may refer to:

Places
Harleston, Devon
Harleston, Norfolk
Harleston, Suffolk

People with the surname
Bernard W. Harleston (born 1930), American college administrator
Edward Harleston (1794–1826), American planter and politician
Edwin Harleston (1882–1931), American painter
Elise Forrest Harleston (1891–1970), American photographer

Other uses
 , several ships
Harleston railway station, Harleston, Norfolk

See also
J. Harleston Parker (1873–1930), American architect
Harleston Parker Medal
Jeffries v. Harleston
Redenhall with Harleston, a place in South Norfolk, England